Suteh (also Romanized as Sūteh) is a village in Rudpey-ye Shomali Rural District, in the Central District of Sari County, Mazandaran Province, Iran. At the 2006 census, its population was 911, in 237 families.

References 

Populated places in Sari County